The Satkhira District (pron: Satkhira) is a district in southwestern Bangladesh and is part of Khulna Division. It lies along the border with West Bengal, India. It is on the bank of the Arpangachhia River. The largest city and headquarter of this district is Satkhira.

Administration
The district consists of two municipalities, seven upazilas, 79 union porishods, 8 thana (police station) and 1436 villages.

The upazilas are:
 Satkhira Sadar Upazila
 Assasuni Upazila
 Debhata Upazila
 Tala Upazila
 Kalaroa Upazila
 Kaliganj Upazila
 Shyamnagar Upazila

The two municipalities are Satkhira and Kalaroa.
 Chairman of Zila Porishod: Nazrul Islam
 Deputy Commissioner (DC): Mohammad Humayun Kabir

Geography
It is bordered to the north by Jessore District, on the south by the Bay of Bengal, to the east by Khulna District, and to the west by North 24 Parganas and South 24 Parganas districts of West Bengal, India.

The annual average maximum temperature reaches 35.5 °C (95.9 °F); minimum temperature is 12.5 °C (54.5 °F). The annual rainfall is 1710 mm (67 in).

The main rivers are the Kopotakhi river across Dorgapur union of Assasuni Upazila, Morichap River, Kholpetua River, Betna River, Raimangal River, Hariabhanga river, Ichamati River, Betrabati River and Kalindi-Jamuna River.

Climate
Tropical savanna climates have a monthly mean temperature above 18 °C (64 °F) in every month of the year and typically a pronounced dry season, with the driest month having precipitation less than 60mm (2.36 in) of precipitation. The Köppen Climate Classification subtype for this climate is "Aw" (tropical savanna climate).

Demographics

According to the 2011 Bangladesh census, Satkhira District had a population of 1,985,959, of which 982,777 were males and 1,003,182 were females. Rural population was 1,788,343 (90.05%) while urban population was 197,616 (9.95%). Satkhira had a literacy rate of 52.07% for the population 7 years and above: 56.11% for males and 48.15% for females.

Muslims formed 81.86% of the population, Hindus 17.70% and others 0.44%. The Muslim population has increased continuously while the Hindu population has remained relatively constant and sometimes fallen. Indications from the 2022 census show the Hindu and Christian populations in the district have fallen dramatically.

Economy

Most of the peoples of southern part of Satkhira depend on pisciculture, locally called gher. Main fruits are aam (mango), jaam (blackberry), kathal (jackfruit), kola (banana), pepe (papaya), lichoo (litchi), naarikel (coconut) and peyara (guava). Farms are 86 dairies, 322 poultry farms, 3046 fisheries, 3650 shrimp farms, 66 hatcheries and one cattle breeding centre. The main exports are shrimp, paddy, jute, wheat, betel leaf, leather and jute goods. Contribute 18.5% of Bangladesh economy. Recently, the wide spread crab fattening is contributing heavily in Satkhira's economy.

Points of interest

The region is home to many ancient buildings and temples such as Sultanpur Shahi Mosque (500 years old) and Pir-e-Kamel Kari Hafez Sah-Sufi Jonab Hozrat Maolana Azizur Rahman (Rh) was a Muslim Sufi Saint and local ruler Kalimakhali, assasuni upozila  in satkhira (now in Bangladesh). Attractions also include the mangrove forest at Kaligonj Upazila. This forest, named Basjharia Joarar Ban, is popularly known as the forest of BADHA. The Joarar Ban is the cause of friction between Bangladesh and Indian border.

Infrastructure

Land ports 

India-Bangladesh (Bhomra land port): 200 yard distant BGP camp from main port. The Bhomra land port is second largest land port in Bangladesh. The Bhomra land customs station was inaugurated in 1996.

Transport
Roads and highways are Satkhira-Khulna, Satkhira-Jessore, Satkhira-Assasuni-Ghola, Satkhira-Kaligonj-Shyamnagar. Satkhira-Kaligonj-Shyamnagar is very bad due to conductor's corruption.

Education

Recently established one medical college, 79 colleges, one primary teachers training institute, 421 high schools, 41 junior high schools, 259 madrassas, 822 government primary schools. Some of the notable educational institutions-

Satkhira Government College

Satkhira City College

Satkhira Medical College

Satkhira Government Girls’ High School

Satkhira Government High School

Satkhira Government Mahila College

Kaliganj Govt. College

Satkhira Day-Night College

Kalaroa government college

Jhaudanga high school

Digital Satkhira

In 1994 few young people started a computer training center as a business and prepared some talents who later started other computer business and ultimately created the idea of digital Satkhira. Slowly the computer replaced manual type machine in the office, bank and other institutions. Schools and colleges started recruiting computer teachers. Many more young people started computer business. Manual (letter) printing presses switched to offset printing using the computer.

First local daily newspaper published name was "Doinik Satkhira Chitra".

First Computer Sales & Service Centre was "Mitul Computer Services"

First Computer Training Centre was "Cosmos Computer"

First Offset Printing Press was "Zahan Offset Printing Press"

In 1999 the Computer Association of Satkhira was established with 30 members. The first president was Mitul Md. Moniruzzaman and General Secretary was Nityananda Sarkar with Vice President Faruque ul-Islam and Sayed Iqbal Babu. Computer Association of Satkhira regularly organizes computer fairs in varieties location for ICT awareness. Some of computer fairs were supported by Bangladesh Computer Samity with the presence of Mustafa Jabbar, current ICT minister.

Notable people
 A. F. M. Entaz Ali
 Habibul Islam Habib - ex-Member of Parliament-105, Satkhira-1, Bangladesh National Parliament, Publicity and Publication Affairs Secretary Bangladesh Nationalist Party
 Khan Bahadur Ahsanullah
 AFM Ruhal Haque
 Soumya Sarkar
 Mustafizur Rahman
 Nilufar Yasmin
 Sabina Yasmin
 Amin Khan (actor)
 Moushumi
 Moushumi Hamid
 Falguni Hamid
 Tariq Anam Khan
 Afzal Hossain
 Rani Sarker
 Muhammad Wajed Ali
 Sikandar Abu Jafar
 S.M Alauddin      *M.R. Khan

Satkhira Government Hospital/Medical College

Private Hospital/Clinic

Private Diagnostic Centre

See also
 Districts of Bangladesh
 Khulna Division

Notes

References

 
Districts of Bangladesh